Cadence Jazz is an American record company and label specializing in noncommercial modern jazz. It is associated with Cadence Magazine.

Cadence Jazz was founded by Bob Rusch in Redwood, New York in 1980.
By 2000 the label had issued more than 100 albums. Its catalogue includes Marilyn Crispell, Beaver Harris, and Frank Lowe. This label is different from the Cadence that produced pop music in the 1950s and 1960s.

Artists

Abdul Zahir Batin
Ahmed Abdullah
Chet Baker
Borbetomagus
Markus Burger
Marilyn Crispell
Bill Dixon
Barbara Donald
Dominic Duval
Scott Fields
Paul Flaherty
Frode Gjerstad
Beaver Harris
Fred Hess
Lindsey Horner
Noah Howard
Per Husby
Paul Lovens
Frank Lowe
Kalaparusha Maurice McIntyre
Don Menza
Jemeel Moondoc
Ivo Perelman
Abbey Rader
Saheb Sarbib
Paul Smoker
Glenn Spearman
Roman Stolyar
Thorgeir Stubø
Bob Szajner
Bobby Zankel

Discography

References

American record labels
American jazz record labels
Record labels established in 1980
Jazz record labels
Cadence Jazz Records artists